Ayla is a common feminine Turkish given name.

Turkish 

In Turkish the name Ayla is commonly said to mean "halo of light around the moon".

Ayla is usually used as synonymous with "moonlight", although it could also mean "halo" in general. "Ay" means "moon" in Turkish, so "Ayla" means the "halo around the moon." "Ayla" also means "with the moon" as a word ("ay" + "la" where "la" is used for "ile" which means "with" in Turkish). However, in the context of given names, its meaning is halo, and can be related to names Aylin (also deriving from "ay"), Tülin, or Aylanur.

Hebrew 

In Hebrew the name Ayla is commonly said to mean "terebinth tree" or "oak tree" from the words "ela/אֵלָה" and "alon/אַלּוֹן" respectively. It has also been attributed to "doe", "gazelle", or "deer" from the words "ayala/אַיָּלָה" and "ayelet/אַיֶלֶת".

Homonyms 

Aila is a homophonous name in Finnish (equivalent of Helga or Olga) meaning "bringer of light", and in Scottish meaning "from a strong and resilient place".

Ayla is sometimes falsely identified as a variant of feminine Arabic name "Aliya" meaning "sublime" or "large". "Aliya" or "Aaliyah" is actually the female form of "Ali" or "Aali" and is an unrelated name. The Turkish variant of "Aaliyah" is closer to "Aliye" not "Alya."

People 
 Ayla (producer) [Ingo Kunzi] (born 1966), German producer and DJ
 Ayla Akat Ata (born 1976), lawyer and politician
 Ayla Aksu (born 1996), Turkish-American tennis player
 Ayla Algan (born 1937), Turkish film/stage actress and singer
 Ayla Arslancan (1936-2015), Turkish actress
 Ayla Brown (born 1988), American artist and former NCAA basketball player
 Ayla Dikmen (born 1944), Turkish singer
 Ayla Erduran (born 1934), Turkish violin player
 Ayla Halit Kazım (born 1934), Turkish Cypriot former politician
 Ayla Huser (born 1992), Swiss badminton player
 Ayla Kalkandelen (1939–2002), Turkish entomologist
 Ayla Kell (born 1990), American actress and former dancer
 Ayla Malik (born 1970), Pakistani politician and journalist
 Ayla Peksoylu [ANGEL-I'], UK-born singer, songwriter, actress, and professional model
 Ayla Reynolds (2010-2011), missing American child
 Safiye Ayla Targan (born 1907), singer of Turkish classical music

Fictional people 
 Ayla, a character from the book series Earth's Children
 Ayla, played by Daryl Hannah in the 1986 film The Clan of the Cave Bear (movie) based on the novel The Clan of the Cave Bear in the Earth's Children series by Jean Auel.
 Ayla Ranzz, a character from DC Comics
 Ayla, a character from the video game Chrono Trigger.
 Ayla, a young Korean girl in the eponymous 2017 Turkish drama film, nicknamed as such by a Turkish soldier because she was found in moonlight.

See also 
 Ayla (disambiguation)

References 

Turkish feminine given names